Jelle ten Rouwelaar (born 24 December 1980 in  Joure) is a Dutch retired footballer, who started his professional career in the 1998–99 season playing for FC Emmen. He was the first-choice goalkeeper of NAC Breda for nine years in which he hardly missed a match. In March 2011, he received a call-up for the Dutch national team, but he did not play.

On 29 April 2016, during the match against Go Ahead Eagles the fans started to applaud his recently deceased mother at the 61st minute in reference to his mother's age. On 19 May 2016, he played his last match during the playoffs of the Dutch professional competitions.

References

External links
 Voetbal International profile 
 
 
 

1980 births
Living people
Dutch footballers
Association football goalkeepers
FC Emmen players
PSV Eindhoven players
FC Groningen players
FC Twente players
PEC Zwolle players
FC Eindhoven players
FK Austria Wien players
NAC Breda players
Eredivisie players
Eerste Divisie players
Austrian Football Bundesliga players
Dutch expatriate footballers
Dutch expatriate sportspeople in Austria
Expatriate footballers in Austria
Footballers from Friesland
People from Skarsterlân